Konzenberg (498 m above sea level) is located in Bavaria in Germany. It is a small village eastern in the valley of the river Mindel, which ends in the Danube.

Villages in Bavaria
Populated places in Günzburg (district)